Colin Purdie Kelly Jr. (July 11, 1915 – December 10, 1941) was a World War II B-17 Flying Fortress pilot who flew bombing runs against the Japanese navy in the first days after the Pearl Harbor attack. He is remembered as one of the first American heroes of the war after ordering his crew to bail out while he remained at the bomber's controls trying to keep the plane in the air before it exploded, killing him. His was the first American B-17 to be shot down in combat.

Life
Kelly was born in Madison, Florida in 1915 and graduated from high school there in 1932. He went on to West Point in 1933, graduated in the Class of 1937, and was assigned to a B-17 bomber group. He was the first Army officer to fly the Boeing Flying Fortress in the Far East.

Battle and death
On December 10, 1941 (December 9 in the United States), Kelly, with 14th Bombardment Squadron, 19th Bombardment Group, United States Army  the Air Corps was in command of B-17C Flying Fortress heavy bomber, #40-2045, which departed from Clark Field, on the island of Luzon, Commonwealth of the Philippines, alone and without escort, to search for an enemy aircraft carrier which had been reported near the coastal city of Aparri, at the northern end of the island.  Kelly's Flying Fortress had not been fully fueled or armed because of an impending Japanese air raid. It carried only three  demolition bombs in its bomb bay. While en route to their assigned target area, Kelly and his crew sighted a Japanese amphibious assault task force north of Aparri, including what they believed was a Fusō-class battleship. The crew was unable to locate the reported aircraft carrier and Kelly decided to return to attack the ships that they had seen earlier.

Kelly made two passes at  while the bombardier, Sergeant Meyer Levin, set up for a precise drop. On the third run, Sergeant Levin released the three bombs in trail and bracketed the IJN light cruiser Natori. It and an escorting destroyer, IJN Harukaze, were damaged during the attack:

...The battleship, actually the light cruiser IJN Natori, was seen about 4 miles offshore and moving slowly parallel with the coastline... A quartering approach to the longitudinal axis of the ship was being flown. The three bombs were released in train as rapidly as the bombardier could get them away. The first bomb struck about 50 yards short, the next alongside, and the third squarely amidship... A great cloud of smoke arose from the point of impact. The forward length of the ship was about 10 degrees off center to portside. The battleship began weaving from side to side and headed toward shore. Large trails of oil followed in its wake...
— Narrative Report of Flight of Captain Colin P. Kelly, Air Corps, O-20811 (deceased) on Dec 10, 1941, by Eugene L. Eubank, Colonel, Air Corps, Commanding, Headquarters, 5th Bomber Command, Malang, Java, Feb 19, 1942.

On its return flight, the bomber was then engaged by the Tainan Air Group A6Ms which had been patrolling over Vigan. They attacked it, followed it, and attacked again. Kelly ordered his crew to bail out and though the fire had spread to the flight deck, Kelly remained at the bomber's controls while he tried to keep the plane straight and level. Staff Sergeant James E. Halkyard, Private First Class Willard L. Money, and Private Robert E. Altman were able to escape from the rear of the B-17. The navigator, Second Lieutenant Joe M. Bean, and the bombardier, Sergeant Levin, went out through the nose escape hatch. As co-pilot Lieutenant Donald Robins tried to open the cockpit's upper escape hatch, the Flying Fortress exploded. Robins was thrown clear and was able to open his parachute. The bodies of Kelly and Technical Sergeant William J. Delehanty were found at the crash site.

The tail assembly was missing. The right wing with two engines still in place remained almost intact although it was burning when the search party arrived. The fuselage and left side of the plane were badly wrecked and burned. Kelly's body ... was found very near the wreckage with his parachute unopened....
— Narrative Report of Flight of Captain Colin P. Kelly, Air Corps, O-20811 (deceased) on Dec 10, 1941, by Eugene L. Eubank, Colonel, Air Corps, Commanding, Headquarters, 5th Bomber Command, Malang, Java, Feb 19, 1942

The attacking planes did not see this, and initially were credited only with a probable "kill", shared jointly by Toyoda, Yamagami, Kikuchi, Nozawa, and Izumi. Saburō Sakai, who has often been credited with destroying this aircraft, was indeed a flight leader engaged in this fight with the bomber, but he and his two wingmen do not appear to have been given official credit for its dispatch.

Early reports misidentified ship attacked as the Japanese heavy cruiser Ashigara, which was present, or as the battleship Haruna, which was not. While initial reports incorrectly stated that the ship was sunk, it was hit but did not sink, although Kelly's crew did report major damage was inflicted.

Honors
Kelly was posthumously awarded the Distinguished Service Cross For "extraordinary heroism" and "selfless bravery". Kelly had earlier in peace time also been awarded the Distinguished Flying Cross.

The United States Junior Chamber of Commerce posthumously gave its 1941 distinguished service award to Kelly on January 22, 1942, in Chicago. The award is given annually to the man under 35 years of age who has rendered the “most significant” service to the nation.

Aviation artist Robert Taylor painted a picture entitled The Legend of Colin Kelly.

President Franklin D. Roosevelt wrote a letter, "To the President of the United States of America in 1956" asking for an appointment for Kelly's infant son.  Colin P. Kelly III went to West Point, but did it on his own taking the examinations and declining the Presidential nomination. He graduated from West Point in 1963.

Colin P. Kelly Jr. Street in San Francisco, near Oracle Park, was named in his honor in 1942. The street had previously been named Japan Street. Colin Kelly Dr. in Dayton, Ohio, is one of many streets near Wright Patterson Air Force Base named to honor Air Force heroes. Colin Kelly Drive in Forest Acres, South Carolina, is also named in his honor, as is Colin Kelly Street in Cranford, New Jersey. Colin Kelly Rd in South Portland, Maine was one of multiple streets in the city named to honor WW II heroes.

The patriotic song There's a Star-Spangled Banner Waving Somewhere by Paul Roberts and Shelby Darnell (recorded by Elton Britt) places Kelly alongside other legendary Americans in the line "I'll see Lincoln, Custer, Washington, and Perry, / Nathan Hale, and Colin Kelly too".{Published by Bob Miller, Inc., 1619 Broadway, New York, New York.  Copyright 1952. Source:sheet music.

He is cited in the 1946 song "Listen Mr. Bilbo" by Bob and Adrienne Claiborne, sung by Pete Seeger, as along with Sgt. Levin "foreigners like those kept America free".

The "Four Freedoms Monument" and Colin Kelly Highway, both in Madison, Florida, are dedicated in his honor.

Colin Kelly Middle School in Eugene, Oregon, was named in his honor in 1945 by the school's first students, who preferred an "ordinary Joe" as a namesake, rather than prestigious military or political figures. The school colors are kelly green and white, and the nickname originally was "Bombers." In 2013, the nickname was changed to "Pilots."

Colin P. Kelly Elementary School in Compton, California, is named in his honor.

The Colin Kelly Heights public housing development, in the City of Tonawanda, NY, was named after him.  This development was completed in 1943.

Colin Powell adopted the pronunciation /ˈkoʊlɪn/ after friends who were impressed by Kelly began pronouncing Powell's name the same way.

Notes

References

External links
Colin Kelly Middle School. Eugene, Oregon

1915 births
1941 deaths
People from Madison, Florida
Military personnel from Florida
United States Military Academy alumni
United States Army Air Forces personnel killed in World War II
Recipients of the Distinguished Service Cross (United States)
United States Army officers
Aviators killed by being shot down
United States Army Air Forces bomber pilots of World War II